Lungteh Shipbuilding (also spelled Lung Teh or Longde) is a Taiwanese ship and boat builder headquartered in Yilan County.

History 

Lungteh was established in 1979.

In 2018 Lungteh won a contract to produce eleven Tuo Chiang Block II corvette and four minelayers for the Taiwanese Navy.

Lungteh exhibited at IDEX in 2019 alongside other Taiwanese defense companies.

In 2019 Lungteh Shipbuilding launched an 80-ton 28m long high speed catamaran research and test vessel named Glorious Star (光榮之星) for the National Chung-Shan Institute of Science and Technology.

On May 24, 2019 Taiwanese President Tsai Ing-Wen visited Lungteh to highlight the mass production of the Tuo Chiang Block II corvette, dubbed a carrier killer by the press. She gave a speech about asymmetrically countering China’s military with smart military procurement and technological innovation.

In August 2020 they launched the first of four high speed minelayers ordered by the Taiwanese Navy. Class delivery was completed in December 2021.

Operations 
Lungteh has five production facilities in Yilan county and offices in Taipei and Singapore.

Lungteh has produced fast ferries, wind farm supply vessels, coastal patrol craft, high speed special forces craft, fireboats, and pilot boats.

Lungteh is a partner in producing the Multipurpose Assault Craft series of combat boats for the Philippine Navy. The series had four variants as of 2018.

See also
 List of companies of Taiwan
 Jong Shyn Shipbuilding Company
 CSBC Corporation, Taiwan
 Defense industry of Taiwan
 Maritime industries of Taiwan

References

External links 
 

Shipbuilding companies of Taiwan
Defence companies of Taiwan
Taiwanese boat builders
Taiwanese brands